Zhu Yueqi (born 13 January 1995) is a Chinese footballer currently playing as a goalkeeper for Wuxi Wugou.

Career statistics

Club
.

Notes

References

1995 births
Living people
Sportspeople from Luoyang
Footballers from Henan
Chinese footballers
Association football goalkeepers
China League Two players
Shanghai Shenhua F.C. players
Shanghai Sunfun F.C. players
Chinese expatriate footballers
Chinese expatriate sportspeople in Spain
Expatriate footballers in Spain